The original Cleator Moor railway station was built by the Whitehaven, Cleator and Egremont Railway. It served the rapidly urbanising town of Cleator Moor, Cumbria, England.

History
The line was one of the fruits of the rapid industrialisation of West Cumberland in the second half of the nineteenth century. The station opened to passengers on 1 July 1857 on the line being developed from Moor Row to Rowrah.

Subsidence led the company to build a deviation line which curved round the west side of the station and the growing settlement, in a similar manner to what it was forced to do at Eskett a few miles to the east. They built a passenger station on the deviation line which would go on to be called Cleator Moor East.

When the deviation line - known locally as the Bowthorn Line - and station opened in 1866 the original station was closed to passengers and became "Cleator Moor Goods Depot", with its line known locally as the Crossfield Loop. It remained open for goods traffic until the 1960s.

Afterlife
Satellite images suggest the station site is Public Open Space. By 2008 the trackbed had been transformed into part of National Cycle Route 71.

See also

 Furness Railway
 Cleator and Workington Junction Railway

References

Sources

Further reading

External links
Map of the line with photos, via RAILSCOT
The station as a goods station on overlain OS maps surveyed from 1898, via National Library of Scotland
The original station on an OS map surveyed in 1863, via National Library of Scotland
The three closed stations on a 1948 OS Map, via npe maps
The station, via Rail Map Online
The station and line as a goods station, via railwaycodes
Cleator Moor East station and deviation line, via railwaycodes
The railways of Cumbria, via Cumbrian Railways Association
Photos of Cumbrian railways, via Cumbrian Railways Association
The railways of Cumbria, via Railways_of_Cumbria
Cumbrian Industrial History, via Cumbria Industrial History Society
The line's and station's Engineer's Line References, via railwaycodes.org.uk
Furness Railtour using many West Cumberland lines 5 September 1954, via sixbellsjunction
A video tour-de-force of the region's closed lines, via cumbriafilmarchive
1882 RCH Diagram showing the station, see page 173 of the pdf, via google
Haematite, via earthminerals
Mining in Cleator Moor, via Haig Pit

Disused railway stations in Cumbria
Railway stations in Great Britain opened in 1857
Railway stations in Great Britain closed in 1866
1857 establishments in England
Cleator Moor